John Edward Barbato (born July 11, 1992) is an American former professional baseball pitcher. He pitched in Major League Baseball (MLB) for the Pittsburgh Pirates, New York Yankees, and Detroit Tigers, and also played in Nippon Professional Baseball (NPB) for the Hokkaido Nippon-Ham Fighters.

Career

Amateur draft
Barbato attended Felix Varela High School in Miami, Florida. He received a scholarship from the University of Florida. The San Diego Padres selected him in the sixth round of the 2010 Major League Baseball draft, and he signed with San Diego rather than attend college.

New York Yankees
The Padres traded Barbato to the New York Yankees for Shawn Kelley on December 29, 2014. The Yankees added him to their 40-man roster after the 2015 season. He made his major league debut on April 5, 2016. He was optioned to the AAA Scranton/Wilkes-Barre RailRiders on May 9, 2016, recalled on August 4, and sent back again on August 6. In 13 games with the Yankees in 2016, Barbato had a 1–2 record with a 7.62 ERA.

Pittsburgh Pirates
Barbato was designated for assignment by the Yankees at the start of the 2017 season and sent to Scranton/Wilkes-Barre. He was subsequently traded to the Pittsburgh Pirates on April 17, 2017, in exchange for Matt Frawley. In 24 relief appearances for the Pirates, Barbato posted a 4.08 ERA with 23 strikeouts in  innings.

Detroit Tigers
On January 11, 2018, Barbato was claimed off waivers by the Detroit Tigers. After starting the season with the AAA Toledo Mud Hens, Barbato was called up on April 26 and made his Tigers debut the following night against the Baltimore Orioles. Barbato was next called up on May 30, 2018. He was called up again on June 20, 2018. After giving up five earned runs in less than an inning two days later, Barbato was placed on the 10-day disabled list with shoulder tightness. He failed to mention previously that the injury had been bothering him all season, which left manager Rod Gardenhire somewhat perplexed since he asked to throw a light bullpen session earlier that day. He was designated for assignment on September 11, 2018. He was sent outright to the Toledo Mud Hens after clearing waivers two days later. Barbato elected free agency on November 2, 2018.

Hokkaido Nippon-Ham Fighters
On December 20, 2018, Barbato signed with the Hokkaido Nippon-Ham Fighters of Nippon Professional Baseball. He was released on October 18, 2019.

On October 11, 2019, Fighters announced that team will not sign with Barbato for next season. On October 18, 2019, he become free agent.

Somerset Patriots
On January 27, 2020, Barbato signed with the Somerset Patriots of the Atlantic League of Professional Baseball. Barbato did not appear for the club in 2020 due to the cancellation of the ALPB season because to the COVID-19 pandemic. In July 2020, Barbato signed on to play for the Sugar Land Lightning Sloths of the Constellation Energy League (a makeshift 4-team independent league created as a result of the COVID-19 pandemic) for the 2020 season. Barbato became a free agent after the year.

Lincoln Saltdogs
On January 27, 2021, Barbato signed with the Lincoln Saltdogs of the American Association of Professional Baseball. Barbato recorded a 0.90 ERA in 2 appearances for the Saltdogs, striking out 12 in 10.0 innings of work.

Toronto Blue Jays
On June 1, 2021, Barbato's contract was purchased by the Toronto Blue Jays organization.

High Point Rockers
On April 21, 2022, Barbato signed with the High Point Rockers of the Atlantic League of Professional Baseball. Barbato did not make an appearance for the Rockers before retiring from professional baseball on July 24.

References

External links 

1992 births
Living people
American expatriate baseball players in Japan
Baseball players from Miami
Detroit Tigers players
Eugene Emeralds players
Fort Wayne TinCaps players
Gulf Coast Tigers players
Hokkaido Nippon-Ham Fighters players
Indianapolis Indians players
Lake Elsinore Storm players
Lakeland Flying Tigers players
Major League Baseball pitchers
New York Yankees players
Nippon Professional Baseball pitchers
Pittsburgh Pirates players
Peoria Javelinas players
San Antonio Missions players
Scranton/Wilkes-Barre RailRiders players
Toledo Mud Hens players
Trenton Thunder players